Quintus Pedius ( – late 43 BC) was a Roman politician and general who lived during the late Republic. He served as a military officer under Julius Caesar for most of his career. Serving with Caesar during the civil war, he was elected praetor in 48 BC and was given a triumph for victories over the Pompeians during the civil war's second Spanish campaign. 

After Caesar's death, he joined with Caesar's heir Octavian and, with him, assumed suffect consulships in 43 BC in place of the ordinary consuls who had fallen in battle. He promulgated the lex Pedia, which established courts in which Caesar's killers and allies thereof were convicted in absentia. He died shortly after the start of the Second Triumvirate's proscriptions.

Early life 
He was the son his homonymous father and his wife, Julia. This Julia was one of the dictator Julius Caesar's sisters, making this Pedius one of Caesar's nephews.

Pedius served under Julius Caesar during the Gallic Wars starting in 57 BC. Broughton's Magistrates of the Roman Republic places his term in Gaul under Caesar from 58–56 BC. In 55 BC, he lost an election for the office of aedile.

During Caesar's civil war, Pedius joined with Caesar. In 48 BC, Pedius assumed a praetorship. In that same year, he commanded a legion and  who had been leading the ill-fated revolt. From 46 to 45 BC, Pedius served as a Caesarian legate in Spain. Pedius claimed victory against Sextus Pompey and returned to Rome with Caesar. He was then honoured with a triumph as pro consule ex Hispania; the honour was granted illegally, according to Dio, as he was merely one of Caesar's legates.

Consulship 

After the ordinary consuls of that year, Gaius Vibius Pansa Caetronianus and Aulus Hirtius, were both killed while fighting against Antony during the battle of Mutina, Octavian – the only surviving commander of senatorial forces – marched on the city at the head of his army to demand his elevation as consul. With Pedius as Octavian's colleague, on 19 August 43 BC, the two assumed office as suffect consuls after an irregularly convoked election.

Lex Pedia 
Their first action was to confirm Octavian's adoption as Caesar's heir; then, at Octavian's suggestion, Pedius promulgated the lex Pedia, which established courts to prosecute Caesar's killers. This overruled a previous senatus consultum which protected the tyrannicides from prosecution. Consequently, Caesar's killers – along with co-conspirators and others who had little to do with the crime – were then convicted in absentia, according to Appian, all in a single day of proceedings. They were formally "debarred from fire and water and their property [was] confiscated".

After the passage of the lex Pedia, he also brought legislation to rescind the declaration of Mark Antony and Marcus Aemilius Lepidus as public enemies. The early and rushed passage of the lex Pedia was likely related to Octavian's attempts to assume for himself leadership of the Caesarian faction by displaying his bona fides in avenging the death of Caesar; the lex Pedia was likely unrelated to the following proscriptions.

Death 

Pedius was left in charge of Rome, while Octavian left for Northern Italy to join Antony and Lepidus in forming the Second Triumvirate. When news reached Rome of the new political alliance and of the lists of people whom the triumvirs had marked for death,  Soon afterwards, Pedius had suffered so much political fatigue he died.

Personal life
Pedius married a Roman noblewoman called Valeria, a sister of Marcus Valerius Messalla Corvinus and thus a daughter of Marcus Valerius Messalla Niger and his wife, Polla. Pedius and Valeria had at least one child, a son named Quintus Pedius Publicola. Publicola became a Roman senator and distinguished himself with his oratory. Pliny the Elder in his Naturalis Historia mentions that Quintus Pedius had a grandson, also named Quintus Pedius, who was mute and supposedly deaf; this grandson may be the

References

Sources

External links 
 

Ancient Roman generals
1st-century BC Roman consuls
Roman Republican praetors
43 BC deaths
Year of birth unknown
Pedii
Family of Julius Caesar